Furuset is an Oslo Metro station in the Furuset borough. It is the penultimate station on the Furuset Line, between Lindeberg and Ellingsrudåsen. The station is located under a fairly large shopping centre, and there is also a small bus terminal above the station. Architects were Økaw Arkitekter.

Furuset was opened 19 February 1978 when the line was extended from Trosterud. It was the end station until 8 November 1981 when the line was completed to Ellingsrudåsen.

References

External links

Oslo Metro stations in Oslo
Railway stations opened in 1978
1978 establishments in Norway